Charles Sumner "Chuck" Stone, Jr. (July 21, 1924 – April 6, 2014) was an American pilot, newspaper editor, journalism professor, and author. He was a member of the Tuskegee Airmen during World War II and was the first president of the National Association of Black Journalists, serving from 1975 to 1977. Passionate about racial issues and supportive of many liberal causes, he refused to follow any party line, "but called the issues as he saw them."

Early life
Chuck Stone was born July 21, 1924 in St. Louis, Missouri to Charles Sumner Stone Sr and Madeline Chafin and raised in Hartford, Connecticut. Stone served in World War II, where he was member of the Tuskegee Airmen. He had already been admitted to Harvard University after completing his military service, but chose instead to matriculate at Wesleyan University, receiving degrees in political science and economics. He was the first African-American undergraduate in several decades at Wesleyan, graduating in the class of 1948 and serving as the commencement speaker. Stone subsequently received a master's degree in sociology from the University of Chicago. After completing his education, he worked for the Chicago department store Carson Pirie Scott, serving as the store's first African-American executive. He then studied law for eighteen months at the University of Connecticut before spending two years in Egypt, Gaza, and India as a representative for CARE.

Professional career

Journalist and educator
Chuck Stone's career in journalism began in 1958, when his friend Al Duckett, then Editor of The New York Age, hired him as a reporter. Several months later he was promoted to Editor by the newspaper's owner, Samuel B. Fuller. Stone worked as a columnist for The Philadelphia Daily News from 1972 to 1991. Stone was very critical of the Philadelphia Police Department's record of brutality towards African-Americans, which made him a trusted middleman between Philadelphia police and criminal suspects, more than 75 of whom 'surrendered' to Stone rather than to the cops. In 1975, he was the M. Lyle Spencer Visiting Professor of Journalism in the S. I. Newhouse School of Public Communications at Syracuse University. He taught journalism at the University of Delaware for seven years, and from 1986–1988, he served as the House Advisor for the Martin Luther King Humanities House at the University of Delaware. Stone later became the Walter Spearman Professor at the University of North Carolina at Chapel Hill, where he retired in 2005.

Stone was nominated twice for the Pulitzer Prize, and was inducted into the National Association of Black Journalists Hall of Fame in August 2004. On March 29, 2007, Stone attended a ceremony in the U.S. Capitol rotunda, where he and the other veteran Tuskegee Airmen (or their widows) were awarded the Congressional Gold Medal by President George W. Bush in recognition of the Airmen's service during World War II.

Civil rights
Chuck Stone became associated with the Civil Rights Movement and the Black Power movement while working as an editor at Harlem's New York Age, the Washington, D.C. Afro-American, and the Chicago Daily Defender.  He also served three years as a special assistant and speechwriter for Rep. Adam Clayton Powell Jr. of the 22nd congressional district of New York, chair of the House Education and Labor Committee. In 1966 Stone was a member of a steering committee organized by Powell to discuss the meaning of the Black Power Movement.<ref name=power>Karenga, Maulana. "Remembering Audacious Black Power: Revisiting the Model and Meaning." Los Angeles Sentinel, July 13, 2016. Retrieved May 23, 2017.</ref>

Awards
Congressional Gold Medal awarded to Tuskegee Airmen in 2006

Personal life
Stone was a member of Alpha Phi Alpha fraternity. He was a member of the fraternity's World Policy Council, a think tank whose purpose is to expand Alpha Phi Alpha's involvement in politics, and social and current policy to encompass international concerns. He was married to Louise Davis Stone for 49 years before they divorced. They are the parents of Krishna Stone, Allegra Stone and Charles Stone III, creator and star of the Budweiser "Whassup!" television commercials, and director of movies such as Drumline, Mr. 3000, and Paid In Full.

Death and legacy
Stone died April 6, 2014, at the age of 89. He was survived by his three children, one grandchild, and two sisters.Weil, Martin. "Charles S. Stone Jr., journalist and professor, dies at 89." The Washington Post, April 6, 2014. Retrieved May 4, 2017. Stone is considered to be the "driving force behind NABJ", and the key to the organization's longevity. Bob Butler, president of the NABJ from 2013 to 2015, credited Stone with helping to improve diversity in newsroom management, stating that "what (diversity) does exist is because of Chuck and the other founders of the NABJ." The Chuck Stone Program for Diversity in Education and Media is a workshop for rising high school seniors at the Hussman School of Journalism and Media, formerly known as the School of Journalism and Mass Communication.  The program, which began in 2007, honors the legacy of Chuck Stone, who retired from the school in 2005. The Chuck Stone Papers are housed in the Rubenstein Rare Book and Manuscript Library as part of the John Hope Franklin Center at Duke University.

Written works
Non-fiction
 Tell It Like It Is. Trident Press, 1967. ASIN B0006BUBAC.
 Black Political Power in America. Bobbs-Merrill Company, 1968. ASIN B0006BW47U.

Fiction
 King Strut (novel). Bobbs-Merrill Company, 1970. ASIN B0006CF6VK.
 Squizzy the Black Squirrel: A Fabulous Fable of Friendship. Open Hand Publishing, 2003. .

See also
 Executive Order 9981
 List of Tuskegee Airmen
 Military history of African Americans
 The Tuskegee Airmen (movie)
 Tuskegee Airmen

References

Further reading
 Dennis Jackson. Chuck Stone: Man in the Middle: A Story of "Audacious Black Power" in the Newsroom Thomson Gale. Contemporary Black Biography.'' Detroit: Gail Research Inc., 2005. .

External links
 Part One of 1990 WABC-TV Like It Is interview with Chuck Stone
Chuck Stone papers, 1931-2007, David M. Rubenstein Rare Book & Manuscript Library, Duke University

1924 births
2014 deaths
Wesleyan University alumni
Tuskegee Airmen
United States Army Air Forces officers
Aviators from Missouri
African-American aviators
University of North Carolina at Chapel Hill faculty
Syracuse University faculty
21st-century African-American people